Mary Beth Carozza (born February 13, 1961) is an American politician who is a Republican member of the Maryland State Senate, representing District 38. She previous represented District 38C in the Maryland House of Delegates from 2015 to 2019.

Background 
Carozza was born on February 13, 1961, in Baltimore, Maryland. Her family moved to the Eastern Shore when she was in the fifth grade and spent her summers working in her parents' business, Beefy's. She attended Stephen Decatur High School in Berlin, Maryland and received a B.A. in political philosophy and an M.A. in American government from the Catholic University of America in 1983.

For most of her career prior to her election to the legislature, she worked as a staffer for Congressional Republicans, including Senators William Cohen and Susan Collins, and U.S. Representatives Mike DeWine, Dave Hobson and Steve Stivers. She also worked as the Deputy Chief of Staff under Governor Robert Ehrlich, where she got to know Larry Hogan, Ehrlich's appointments secretary.

In 2013, Carozza filed to run for state delegate in the newly created 38C district. She was the only Republican to declare her candidacy for the seat. She defeated Democrat Judy Davis in the general election with 74 percent of the vote.

In the legislature 
Carozza was sworn in as a member of House of Delegates on January 12, 2015, and appointed to the House Appropriations Committee.

In November 2017, Carozza, with the backing of Governor Hogan, announced her candidacy to the Maryland Senate, seeking to challenge Democratic state senator Jim Mathias, a top Republican target, in the 2018 state senate elections. She defeated Mathias in the general election, receiving 53 percent of the vote.

Carozza was sworn in as a member of the Maryland Senate on January 9, 2019. She currently serves as the policy and communications chair of the Maryland Senate Republican Caucus.

Committee assignments 
Maryland Senate
 Member, Education, Health and Environmental Affairs Committee, 2019–present (alcohol subcommittee, 2019–present; environment subcommittee, 2019–present)
 Joint Committee on Children, Youth, and Families, 2019–present
 Joint Committee on Federal Relations, 2019–present
 Member, Senate Small Business Work Group, 2019–present

Maryland  House of Delegates
 Member, Appropriations Committee, 2015–2019 (health & human resources subcommittee, 2015–2017; oversight committee on personnel, 2015–2019; health & social services subcommittee, 2017–2019)
 Joint Committee on Legislative Information Technology and Open Government, 2015–2019

Other memberships 
 Maryland Watermen's Caucus, 2019–present
 House Chair, Worcester County Delegation, 2015–2019
 Member, Maryland Veterans Caucus, 2015–present
 Women Legislators of Maryland, 2015–present

Political positions

Agriculture 
Carozza introduced legislation in the 2022 legislative session that would exempt farm structures used for agritourism activities from certain requirements typically applied to commercial buildings. The bill received a favorable report from the Senate Education, Health, and Environmental Affairs Committee.

Alcohol 
Carozza introduced legislation in the 2018 legislative session that would allow Worcester County to increase its beer production from 15,500 gallons to 31,000 gallons each year. The bill passed and was signed into law in March 2018.

Carozza introduced legislation in the 2019 legislative session that would decrease the permitted proximity of liquor stores to churches, schools, public libraries, and youth centers in Somerset County from 300 feet to 200 feet. The bill passed and became law without Governor Hogan's signature on May 25, 2019.

In March 2021, Carozza voted in favor of legislation that would continue the practice of selling beer, wine, and spirits through carryout or delivery for off-site consumption. The bill passed and became law.

Carozza introduced legislation in the 2022 legislative session that would abolish Somerset County's alcohol dispensary system, which requires that liquor be purchased through county-run stores, and create a $5,000 license fee for business owners that want to sell liquor.

Animal rights 
In January 2022, the Maryland Humane Society Legislative Fund gave Carozza a score of 100 percent in their annual legislative scorecard.

Crime 
Following a string of false bomb threats made against schools and other public facilities across Delmarva in early 2016, Carozza introduced legislation that would strengthen punishments for those who make fake bomb threats. The bill passed and was signed into law by Governor Hogan on May 19, 2016.

Following several serious boating incidents in Ocean City, Maryland, Carozza introduced legislation in the 2017 legislative session that would ban bow riding.

Carozza introduced legislation in the 2017 legislative session that would increase the penalties for causing life-threatening injuries while operating a vehicle negligently. The bill was reintroduced during the 2019 and 2021 legislative sessions. The bill passed and became law.

Following several troubling motorized special events in Ocean City, Carozza introduced legislation during the 2018 legislative session that would allow for the creation of special event enforcement zones to enforce enhanced fines and penalties on reckless drivers. She introduced legislation aimed at strengthening the penalties for violations in these special event zones during the 2019 and 2021 legislative sessions.

Education 
Carozza opposed legislation introduced during the 2019 legislative session that would allow Maryland public schools to start before Labor Day. The Maryland General Assembly voted to override Hogan's veto on the bill in March 2019.

Carozza opposed legislation introduced during the 2021 legislative session that would give collective bargaining rights to full- and part-time employees at all of the state's community colleges. She also questioned legislation that expands required training for school resource officers to include restorative approaches and prevents officers from enforcing discipline except to prevent or intervene in a situation where "serious bodily injury with an imminent threat of serious harm" is at stake, referring to the 2018 shooting at Great Mills High School in Southern Maryland.

Environment 
In 2015, Carozza spearheaded an effort to encourage the United States Army Corps of Engineers to dredge the inlet of Ocean City, Maryland, arguing that the shallow water in the inlet puts the economy of Worcester County in jeopardy. Following Carozza's request, the Army Corps of Engineers announced plans to dredge the inlet in August 2015. During the 2016 legislative session, she introduced legislation that would authorize the use of hydraulic dredging to catch hard-shell clams between the Verrazano Bridge and the Maryland-Virginia state line.

Carozza opposed legislation introduced in the 2017 legislative session that would boost the state's renewable energy standards. The Maryland General Assembly voted to override Governor Hogan's veto of the bill.

Carozza introduced legislation during the 2018 legislative session that would move the proposed wind farm in Ocean City further from the shore. The measure was killed by the House Economic Matters Committee. In 2021, she urged the Maryland Public Service Commission to move a proposed wind farm off the coast of Ocean City farther offshore, insisting that the turbines would damage views from the shore, jeopardizing tourism, real estate values, and the local economy.

In 2018, the Maryland League of Conservation Voters gave Carozza a score of 80 percent on its annual legislative scorecard.

Carozza introduced legislation in the 2021 legislative session that would prohibit the deliberate release of balloons into the stratosphere. The bill passed and became law on May 30, 2021.

Healthcare 
During a debate on legislation that would require businesses to provide paid sick leave to most of its employees, Carozza introduced an amendment to the bill that would increase the threshold for eligibility from 90 days to 120 days. The amendment was rejected by the Maryland House of Delegates.

Following the death of local resident Chris Trimper, who suffered an extreme allergic reaction during a reception at the Ocean Downs Casino, in October 2019, Carozza introduced legislation during the 2020 legislative session that would allow restaurants to carry and administer EpiPens during emergency situations. The bill passed unanimously and was signed by Governor Hogan on March 19, 2020.

Immigration 
During her 2018 state senate campaign, Carozza said that she would vote against any legislation that would make Maryland a sanctuary state.

Carozza opposed legislation introduced in the 2021 legislative session that would ban local jails from housing detainees for Immigration and Customs Enforcement. The bill passed the Maryland General Assembly but received a veto from Governor Hogan in May 2021; the General Assembly overrode the veto in December 2021.

Marijuana 
During a debate on legislation that would establish that smoking marijuana in a public place as a civil offense, Carozza introduced an amendment that would make it a misdemeanor to smoke marijuana in certain public places, including the beach and boardwalk in Ocean City, Maryland. The House of Delegates approved the amendment and the bill passed the legislation with the amendment in place by a vote of 90-48, but Governor Hogan vetoed the bill in May 2015.

Minimum wage 
During a debate on legislation introduced during the 2019 legislative session that would raise the Maryland minimum wage to $15 an hour in 2028, Carozza introduced an amendment that would slow the increase of the minimum wage overall and apply a 20 percent lower regional wage in parts of the state outside of Montgomery County, Prince George's County, Howard County, Anne Arundel County, Baltimore County, and Baltimore City. Her amendment failed by a vote of 18-29.

Policing 
In June 2021, following the release of a viral video showing Ocean City police officers exerting force against a group of Black teenagers on the boardwalk, Carozza made a statement defending the Ocean City police, saying that the individuals detained in the incident were arrested for multiple violations including disorderly conduct, failure to obey a police order, obstructing and hindering, second-degree assault, and resisting arrest.

Redistricting 
In June 2021, Carozza urged members of the Maryland Citizens Redistricting Commission to adopt single-member legislative districts and to keep the Eastern Shore whole in the redistricting process. She opposed the congressional map introduced by the Maryland Legislative Redistricting Committee during the 2021 special legislative session.

Electoral history

References

External links

1961 births
Living people
Republican Party members of the Maryland House of Delegates
21st-century American politicians
21st-century American women politicians
Politicians from Baltimore
People from Berlin, Maryland
Catholic University of America alumni
Republican Party Maryland state senators